Burak Hakkı (born 23 May 1972) is a Turkish actor and model.

Biography
After Ottoman Empire collapsed, his paternal family is of Turkish descent who immigrated from Komotini and Thessaloniki. He won the Best Model of Turkey in 1994. He was a basketball player in Nasaş Basketball Club.

Hakkı is best known for his roles as Hüseyin Kenan in Dudaktan Kalbe based on the classic novel by Reşat Nuri Güntekin and as Kayqubad I the Seljuq Sultan of Rûm in Diriliş: Ertuğrul and as Ali in Kaybolan Yıllar. Hakkı acted in Yeniden Çalıkuşu which is not a direct adaptation of the classic novel Çalıkuşu by Reşat Nuri Güntekin.

Filmography

References

External links
 

Living people
1969 births
Male actors from Istanbul
Turkish male television actors